This is the discography for American jazz musician Maceo Parker.

As leader

As sideman

Filmography

References 

Discographies of American artists
Jazz discographies